The Quest Carbon Capture and Storage Project captures and stores underground one million tonnes of CO2 emissions per year. The capture unit is located at the Scotford Upgrader in Alberta, Canada, where hydrogen is produced to upgrade bitumen from oil sands into synthetic crude oil.

Technology 
Mined bitumen extracted from Alberta’s oil sands is a heavy oil that needs an upgrading process before being delivered to refineries and transformed into marketable products. The upgrading process is energy intensive and requires hydrogen that is produced from a steam methane reformer. Making hydrogen creates carbon dioxide that at Quest is captured and separated from nitrogen through an absorption amine technology process. Captured CO2 is subsequently compressed and transported for 64 km where CO2 is stored two kilometers underground into a saline aquifer.

Current status 
The project began capturing CO2 on August 23, 2015. Quest Carbon Capture and Storage Project at Scotford has the capacity to capture approximately one-third of the CO2 emissions from the Scotford Upgrader. The cumulative stored volume is expected to be greater than 27 million tonnes of CO2 over the anticipated 25 year life of the Scotford Upgrader.

References

Carbon capture and storage